Dempsey is a 1983 television film based on the life of the heavyweight boxer Jack Dempsey that starred Treat Williams and Sally Kellerman.

Plot
Jack Dempsey starts out fighting in bars for half the take. He wins his first professional fight.  After a later bout, he and his manager are held up at gunpoint and robbed of the purse. He sees the thieves later and beats them up to recover the cash.

Jack meets Maxine Cates, but goes to New York to box. After a bout with John Lester Johnson is a draw, he breaks with his manager and goes back to Salt Lake City and marries Maxine.

After money disputes with her Maxine leaves, and Dempsey goes to San Francisco.  Kerns becomes his manager. He wins fights, goes to New York, and divorces Maxine. He beats Jess Willard by a TKO and becomes heavyweight champ.

Dempsey goes to Hollywood to make films and gets sued for non-support by Maxine. He fights Luis Firpo and is knocked out of the ring, but still wins. He is sick (perhaps poisoned), but still fights Gene Tunney and loses a decision.

On September 22, 1927 he fights Tunney again. Dempsey knocks Tunney down, but the count doesn't start until Dempsey goes to a neutral corner. This gives Tunney time to recover and get up when the count reaches 9. In this famous "long count" fight Tunney wins by decision.

Cast
Treat Williams as Jack Dempsey
Sally Kellerman as Maxine Cates
Sam Waterston as "Doc" Kearns
Victoria Tennant as Estelle Taylor
Robert Harper as Damon Runyon
Jimmy Nickerson as Gene Tunney
Clay Hodges as Jess Willard
Eli Cummins as Luis Firpo
Bonnie Bartlett as Celia Dempsey 
John McLiam as Hyrum Dempsey 
Peter Mark Richman as Tex Rickard 
Jesse Vint as Bernie Dempsey 
James Noble as Gavin McNab
John Lehne as Gene Normile
Cliff Emmich as Otto
Michael McManus as Babe Ruth
Mark L. Taylor as Price

External links

1983 television films
1983 films
American television films
American boxing films
Films set in the 1910s
Films set in 1927
Films set in the 1930s
Cultural depictions of Jack Dempsey
Cultural depictions of Babe Ruth
Films scored by Billy Goldenberg
Films set in Los Angeles
Films set in New York (state)
Films set in San Francisco
Films set in Utah
Films directed by Gus Trikonis
1980s English-language films
1980s American films